Xylophanes irrorata is a moth of the  family Sphingidae. It is known from Cuba.

The upperside and underside of the body and wings is uniformly pale pinkish-brown, although the underside is paler than the upperside. The forewing upperside has a darker brown postmedian line, with a pale proximal border, running from the hind margin towards the apex (but not reaching it). The hindwing upperside has an olive-brown basal area.

Adults are probably on wing year-round.

The larvae possibly feed on Psychotria panamensis, Psychotria nervosa and Pavonia guanacastensis.

References

irrorata
Moths described in 1865
Endemic fauna of Cuba